WLL can refer to:

 West London line, a railway line in London
 Wikipedia Loves Libraries
 Wireless local loop
 With Limited Liability
 Women's Labour League
 Working load limit, the maximum load which may be safely applied to a given product or component
 Written Language and Literacy, a journal of linguistics